The PGA Championship is an annual golf competition formerly held in mid-August until 2019, when it moved to mid-May. It was established in 1916 and is one of the four major championships played each year which include the Masters, the U.S. Open, and the Open Championship (British Open). In addition, this championship is conducted by the Professional Golfers' Association of America (PGA).  Due to World War I and II, the competition was not held from 1917 to 1918 and in 1943, respectively.

The reigning champion of the competition is automatically invited to play in the other three majors for the next five years, and is exempt from qualifying for the PGA Championship for life. The champion also receives membership on the PGA Tour for the following five years and invitations to The Players Championship for five years. The prize of the tournament is the Wanamaker Trophy, which the champion keeps until the following year's competition. The PGA Championship was originally a match play event; however, in 1958 it was changed to a stroke play event.

Walter Hagen (match play) and Jack Nicklaus (stroke play) hold the record for the most victories; both men have won the competition five times. Hagen holds the record for most consecutive wins in match play with four (1924–27), and Tiger Woods holds the record for most consecutive wins in stroke play with two, which he did twice (1999–2000, 2006–07). Phil Mickelson is the oldest winner of the PGA Championship; he was 50 years, 11 months old when he won in 2021. The youngest winner of the PGA Championship is Gene Sarazen, who was 20 years, 174 days old when he won in 1922. David Toms holds the record for the lowest score over 72 holes, which is 265.

Jason Day holds the record for most strokes under par for 72 holes, 20, when he won the 2015 PGA Championship. This is the record under par score in all major championships. The PGA Championship has had three wire-to-wire champions: Bobby Nichols in 1964, Raymond Floyd in 1982, and Hal Sutton in 1983. Four others have led wire-to-wire if ties after a round are counted: Floyd in 1969, Nick Price in 1994, Woods in 2000 and Mickelson in 2005.

Champions

Match play

Stroke play

Multiple champions

By nationality

Notes

 The PGA Championship was not held from 1917 to 1918 because of World War I.
 The 1943 PGA Championship was not held because of World War II.
 Par is a predetermined number of strokes that a golfer should require to complete a hole, a round (the sum of the total pars of the played holes), or a tournament (the sum of the total pars of each round). E stands for even, which means the tournament was completed in the predetermined number of strokes.
 Jerry Barber won in a playoff against Don January.
 Don January won in a playoff against Don Massengale.
 Lanny Wadkins won in a playoff against Gene Littler.
 John Mahaffey won in a playoff against Tom Watson and Jerry Pate.
 David Graham won in a playoff against Ben Crenshaw.
 Larry Nelson won in a playoff against Lanny Wadkins.
 Paul Azinger won in a playoff against Greg Norman.
 Steve Elkington won in a playoff against Colin Montgomerie.
 Mark Brooks won in a playoff against Kenny Perry.
 Tiger Woods won in a playoff against Bob May.
 Vijay Singh won in a playoff against Chris DiMarco and Justin Leonard.
 Martin Kaymer won in a playoff against Bubba Watson.
 Keegan Bradley won in a playoff against Jason Dufner.

References
General

Specific

External links
PGA Media Guide
PGA Championship History Exhibit

List
PGA